The 1940 Wake Forest Demon Deacons football team was an American football team that represented Wake Forest University during the 1940 college football season. In its fourth season under head coach Peahead Walker, the team compiled a 7–3 record and finished in third place in the Southern Conference.

Wake Forest back Tony Gallovich was selected by the Associated Press as a first-team player on the 1940 All-Southern Conference football team.

Schedule

References

Wake Forest
Wake Forest Demon Deacons football seasons
Wake Forest Demon Deacons football